The following is a list of awards and nominations received by the Safdie brothers.

AFI Fest

Awards Circuit Community Awards

Black Reel Awards

Cannes Film Festival

Critics' Choice Movie Awards

Gijón International Film Festival

Gotham Awards

Independent Spirit Awards

Los Angeles Film Critics Association

National Board of Review

New York Film Critics Circle

San Diego Film Critics Society

Seattle Film Critics Society

Stockholm International Film Festival

Sundance Film Festival

Notes

References

External links
 
 

Safdie brothers